This is a list of rack railways, both operating and closed.

Angola 
 Lengue gorge.
 on Benguela railway – 1906. 1,067 mm (3 ft 6 in) gauge.

Argentina 
 Transandine Railway between Mendoza and Santa Rosa de Los Andes, Chile, see Chile below.

Australia 
 West Coast Wilderness Railway in Tasmania, originally opened in 1896 to service the Mount Lyell copper mine and closed and completely removed in 1960s.  Rebuilt and re-opened for tourists in 2003. Uses the Abt rack system.  gauge.
 Mt Morgan Rack Railway on Mount Morgan – rack system existed until 1952 when the line was deviated.  Used the Abt rack system.   gauge.
 Ellalong Colliery – underground Lamella rack – installed in 1984
 Skitube Alpine Railway – Lamella rack – in the Snowy Mountains, opened in 1987;  gauge.
 Blue Mountains sewerage project – temporary  gauge construction railway, 1995

Austria 
 Achensee Railway (Achenseebahn), Tyrol   
 Erzberg Railway (Erzbergbahn), Styria 
 Gaisberg Railway (Gaisbergbahn), Gaisberg (1887–1928) 
 Kahlenberg Railway (Kahlenbergbahn), Kahlenberg, Döbling, Vienna (1872–1920)
 Schafberg Railway (Schafbergbahn), Upper Austria  
 Schneeberg Railway (Schneebergbahn), Lower Austria

Bolivia 
 Rio Mulatos-Potosí line

Brazil 

 Corcovado Rack Railway
 The Estrada de Ferro Santos-Jundiaí which became part of Rede Ferroviária Federal Sociedade Anônima (RFFSA) 1957–1997, now owned by MRS Logística.  gauge between Paranapiacaba and Raiz de Serra.
 Teresopolis and Petropolis railways, both out of service, near Rio de Janeiro.

Chile 
 Arica–La Paz railway, Arica–La Paz
 Santa Lucía Hill tramway (Abt system), Santiago (1902–1910)
 The Transandine Railway, Santa Rosa de Los Andes – Mendoza, Argentina The rebuild will be adhesion only and use a base tunnel.

China 
 Dujiangyan–Siguniangshan mountain railway (under construction, to be opened in 2024~2025)

Czech Republic 
 Cog railway Tanvald-Harrachov

France 
 Lyon Metro Line C
 Mont Blanc Tramway
 Montenvers Railway
 Petit train de la Rhune
 Panoramique des Domes

Germany 

 Drachenfels Railway (Drachenfelsbahn)
 Harz Railway (Harzbahn, adhesion only today)
 Rübeland Railway (Rübelandbahn, adhesion only today)

 Höllentalbahn (adhesion only since 1933)
 Murg Valley Railway (adhesion only since 1926)
 Stuttgart Rack Railway, Stuttgart
 Wendelstein Railway (Wendelsteinbahn)
 Bavarian Zugspitze Railway  (Bayerische Zugspitzbahn)

Greece 
 Diakofto Kalavrita Railway

Hungary 
 Fogaskerekű Vasút in Budapest, Hungary is a kind of cog-wheel tram in the hilly Buda part of the city.

India 
 Nilgiri Mountain Railway, in the Indian state of Tamil Nadu is also a World Heritage Site. It runs using steam powered 'X' Class locomotives built by the Swiss Locomotive and Machine Works.

Indonesia 

 The former State Railways of West Sumatra's line between Kayu Tanam and Batu Tabal (reactivation pending), and Padang Panjang to Payakumbuh (disused).
 The former Netherlands East Indies Railways' line between Ambarawa and Gemawang, on the Kedungjati-Ambarawa-Magelang-Yogyakarta line. Only the Ambarawa-Bedono section is in operation as a tourist line.
Both railways used the Riggenbach system.

Italy 

 Mont Cenis Pass Railway; temporary while main tunnel built.
 Vesuvius Funicular (1880–1944; originally built as a funicular and then changed to a rack railway.  It was the only railway climbing an active volcano.  It was destroyed various times by Vesuvius eruptions.  With its last destruction in 1944, it was never built again.  It is famous worldwide as a result of the song "Funiculì Funiculà" written about it)
 Opicina Tramway (1902–1928; rack replaced with a funicular section)
 Rittnerbahn (rack section closed)
 Superga Rack Railway
 Principe–Granarolo rack railway in the city of Genoa
 S.Ellero – Saltino (1892–1922; it was the first rack railway built in Italy)
 Lagonegro-Castrovillari-Spezzano Albanese of Ferrovie Calabro Lucane (1915–1978; it consisted of a series of separated lines which had to be unified into a single one but the project was never completed)
 Vibo Valentia-Mileto of Ferrovie Calabro Lucane (1917–1966; it was a local rack railway localized in south Italy)
 Rocchette-Asiago (1910–1958; it was the highest Italian rack railway)
 Catanzaro Città – Catanzaro Sala of Ferrovie della Calabria (Actually on service; it connects the city of Catanzaro to the borough of Sala)
 Paola-Cosenza of Ferrovie dello Stato (1915–1987; it was replaced by a tunnel)
 Saline-Volterra of Ferrovie dello Stato (1863–1958; it was part of a railway which connected Cecina to Volterra. Downstream flat line, from Cecina to Saline, is actually on service)
 Dittaino-Leonforte of Ferrovie dello Stato (1918–1959; it was located on the island of Sicily)
 Dittaino-Piazza Armerina of Ferrovie dello Stato (1912–1971; it was dismissed after a series of landslides which damaged some parts of the line)
 Lercara Bassa-Filaga-Palazzo Adriano-Magazzolo of Ferrovie dello Stato (1924–1959; it was used for mining and workers transports in Sicily )
 Agrigento-Naro-Licata (1911–1960; it was used to transport sulfur extracted from mines located on the island of Sicily)

Japan 
 Ikawa Line, Oigawa Railway
 Usui Pass was the first rack and pinion line in Japan, on the Shin-Etsu Line of the then Japanese National Railway.  It was replaced in 1963 by a new parallel adhesion line, and in turn replaced by the Nagano Shinkansen line opened for the 1998 Winter Olympics at Nagano.

Lebanon 
 A rack railway used to exist on the climb from Beirut to Syria, gauge .

Mexico 
 The  gauge Mapimi Railroad in Durango State had a short Abt rack section from El Cambio to Ojuela. The maximum grade was 13.6% and it was worked by two Baldwin 0-6-2T steam locomotives built in 1896 and two Baldwin 2-6-2T steam locomotives built in 1898 and 1900. The railroad closed in the early 1930s.

Panama 
 Large ships are guided through the Panama Canal Locks by electric locomotives known as mulas (mules), running on rack rails on the lock walls. The new locks, projected to open in 2015, will use tugs.

Philippines 
 The Manila Railway and Manila Railroad companies (now the Philippine National Railways) briefly operated oil burning cog locomotives starting in 1914 until 1917. One of these locomotives were named Mirador, named after one of the mountains along the proposed Aringay–Baguio line.

Portugal 
 Monte Railway – there was previously a cog railway from Funchal to Monte in Madeira Island, which operated between 1893 and 1943, and went further up to Terreiro da Luta at 867 m above sea level.

Romania 
 Bouțari - Sarmizegetusa segment of Caransebeș - Subcetate railway, measuring 18.78 km, between 1909 and 1978.

Slovakia 
 Štrbské Pleso – Štrba rack railway
 Brezno – Tisovec rack railway
 Zakarovce rack railway (Marienhütte ironworks)

South Africa 
 There used to be a Riggenbach rack railway built by the NZASM between Waterval Boven and Waterval Onder.  It was in operation until 1908.  gauge.

Spain 
 Montserrat Rack Railway
 Vall de Núria Rack Railway

Switzerland 
 Appenzeller Bahnen
 Bergbahn Rheineck-Walzenhausen (RhW) 
 Berner Oberland Bahn, also owning Schynige Platte Railway
 Chemin de fer Aigle-Leysin
 Chemin de fer Aigle-Ollon-Monthey-Champéry
 Chemin de fer Bex-Villars-Bretaye
 Chemin de fer Blonay – Les Pléiades
 Brienz Rothorn Bahn
 Chemin de Fer de Martigny au Châtelard (MC) 
 Chemin de fer Montreux-Glion-Rochers-de-Naye 
 Dampfbahn Furka-Bergstrecke (DFB)
 Dolderbahn (Db) 
 Gornergratbahn (owned by BVZ Holding and managed by MGB)
 Joweid Zahnradbahn (a now closed freight line)
 Jungfraubahn – the highest rack railway in Europe
 Lausanne-Ouchy (1958-2006),  see Métro Lausanne–Ouchy #History
 Lausanne Flon-Gare
 Matterhorn-Gotthard Railway (MGB) (former Furka Oberalp Bahn and Brig-Visp-Zermatt Railway)
 Mühleggbahn (1950-1975, funicular before and afterwards)
 Monte Generoso Railway
 Pilatus Railway
 Rigi Bahnen (Arth-Rigi and Vitznau-Rigi railways)
 Rorschach-Heiden-Bahn, Rorschach to Heiden
 Wengernalpbahn – the longest continuous rack railway in the world
 Zentralbahn (Zb) (former Swiss Federal Railway's Brünigbahn and Luzern-Stans-Engelberg-Bahn)

United Kingdom 
 Snowdon Mountain Railway

United States 

 The Chicago Tunnel Company (abandoned) used the Morgan rack system on the steep grade up to Grant Park.
 Manitou and Pike's Peak Railway, Manitou Springs, Colorado. Swiss-made Diesel-Pneumatic railcars, 1- or 2-car trains. Abt rack system.
 Mount Washington Cog Railway, Bretton Woods, New Hampshire. Bio Diesel & live steam cog train operations with Marsh rack system, world's first to be used as a mountain railway (inaugurated in 1868).
 Quincy and Torch Lake Cog Railway, cog rail tram opened in 1997. Hancock, Michigan.
 Green Mountain Cog Railway (abandoned)

Venezuela 
 The Puerto Cabello and Valencia Railway (abandoned) was constructed in the 1880s. It used rack and pinion (Abt system) on a steep section at Trincheras.

Vietnam 
 The Đà Lạt-Tháp Chàm Railway in Southern Vietnam. Abandoned after the Vietnam War, although a 7 km section remains in use as a tourist attraction. Built in the 1920s, the 84 km line had a cogwheel part 34 km long, running through four tunnels with a total length of almost 1,000 meters, taking trains from the Krongpha Pass up the Ngoan Muc (Bellevue) Pass to Da Lat.

References

Rack railways